Battles is the twelfth studio album by Swedish heavy metal band In Flames. It was released on 11 November 2016 in the United States via Eleven Seven Music. It is the last album to feature longtime bassist Peter Iwers and the first of two albums to feature former Red drummer Joe Rickard, who replaced longtime drummer Daniel Svensson, who left the band in 2015. Music videos were made for the tracks "Here Until Forever" and "The End".

Track listing

Personnel
In Flames
Anders Fridén – vocals
Björn Gelotte – lead guitar
Niclas Engelin – rhythm guitar
Peter Iwers – bass
Joe Rickard – drums, drum programming

Additional musicians
Örjan Örnkloo – keyboards, programming
Marc Vangool – pedal steel guitar

Other personnel
 Howard Benson – production
 Mike Plotnikoff – engineer, mixing
 Hatsukazu "Hatch" Inagaki – engineering
 Carl Stoodt – engineering assistance
 Shaun Ezrol – engineering assistance
 Tom Coyne – mastering
 Randy Merrill – mastering assistance
 Paul Decarli – editing
 Mark Vangool – guitar technician
 Blake Armstrong – artwork, design
 Andy C. Fellows – design

Charts

References

External links
 

2016 albums
In Flames albums
Nuclear Blast albums
Eleven Seven Label Group albums